Sergei Yuryevich Sharin (born 5 August 1984) is a former Russian professional football player.

Club career
He played 6 seasons in the Russian Football National League for FC Sibir Novosibirsk, FC Vityaz Podolsk and FC Yenisey Krasnoyarsk.

External links
 
 

1984 births
Living people
Russian footballers
Association football midfielders
FC Sibir Novosibirsk players
FC Vityaz Podolsk players
FC Yenisey Krasnoyarsk players
FC Sakhalin Yuzhno-Sakhalinsk players
FC Moscow players